Don't Be Tardy is an American reality television series aired on Bravo that debuted on April 26, 2012, as Don't Be Tardy For The Wedding. It is a spin-off of The Real Housewives of Atlanta. The series features Kim Zolciak, her husband Kroy Biermann and her family. The first season documented the couple as they prepared for their wedding, as well as documenting the wedding day itself. It was announced in November 2012 that the series had been renamed to its current title upon renewal. Later seasons follow the day-to-day lives of the Zolciak-Biermann family.

Series overview

Episodes

Season 1 (2012)

Season 2 (2013)

Season 3 (2014)

Season 4 (2015)

Season 5 (2016)

Season 6 (2017)

Season 7 (2019)

Season 8 (2020)

References

External links
 
 

Lists of American non-fiction television series episodes
Lists of American reality television series episodes
The Real Housewives spin-offs